HLA-B78 (B78) is an HLA-B serotype. The serotype identifies the more common HLA-B*78 gene products. B78 is more common in West and North Africa, but is also scattered at low frequencies in parts of Asia. (For terminology help see: HLA-serotype tutorial)

Serotype

Allele frequencies

References

7